Belhaven Hospital is a community hospital in Beveridge Row, Dunbar, East Lothian. The hospital is managed by NHS Lothian.

History
The hospital was designed by Sydney Mitchell and George Wilson and built as an infectious diseases facility between 1903 and 1904. An emergency operating theatre was added during the Second World War and the hospital joined the National Health Service in 1948. In January 2018 the hospital board announced that ward 2 would be closed for clinical use.

Services
The hospital provides continuing care and GP beds for the frail and elderly.

References

Buildings and structures in East Lothian
NHS Scotland hospitals
NHS Lothian
Dunbar